The Villa Hugo Hecht is an historical house in downtown Bydgoszcz, registered on the Kuyavian-Pomeranian Voivodeship Heritage List.

Location
The house comprises two buildings (at Nr.88 and Nr.90). It lies on the eastern side of Gdańska Street, between Zamoyskiego and Chodkiewcza streets.

It stands close to remarkable tenements in the same street:
 Villa Carl Grosse at 84;
 Otto Riedl Tenement at 85;
 Tenement at 91 Gdanska street;
 Hugo Hecht tenement at 92/94.

History
Both houses have been built in the years 1888-1889. They were part of a project of six close stylish buildings ordered by the merchant and dealer in timber Hugo Felix Franz Hecht.
He assigned Bydgoszcz architect Józef Święcicki to realize his scheme.

The owner of the buildings between 1900 and 1939 was an activist and social worker in Bydgoszcz, physician  Hermann Dietz. He had made in 1900 an residential wing added to the building, according to a design of the initial project manager, Joseph Święcicki.
At this time, the address of the villa was 123-124 Danziger Straße.

Architecture
The two juxtaposed buildings, covered with mansard roofs, seemingly create a uniform shape. However, the architect, through the use of different decorative motifs on each of the buildings, subtly contrasted them. Both villas represent a style modeled on the French Neo-Renaissance.

This is reflected in the choice of details and in the structure of the edifice with a characteristic avant-corps, topped with a decorative gable, breaking the facade symmetry. Frontage is decorated with diverse architectural details. 
Cast iron decorative elements have remained to this day, such as the barrier railing that runs along the roof of both buildings, pushing further the architectural unity of the edifice.

The building has been put on the Kuyavian-Pomeranian Voivodeship Heritage List Nr.601315 Reg.A/137, on March 19, 2004.

Gallery

See also

 Gdanska Street in Bydgoszcz
 Józef Święcicki
 Hermann Dietz

References

Bibliography
 

Cultural heritage monuments in Bydgoszcz
Buildings and structures on Gdańska Street, Bydgoszcz
Villas in Bydgoszcz
Buildings by Józef Święcicki
Residential buildings completed in 1889